Mont Chaberton is a  peak in the French Alps in the group known as the Massif des Cerces in the département of Hautes-Alpes.

Geography 
The mountain is located close to the main chain of the Alps where it marks the Dora-Durance water divide, on the eastern side of it.  The Col du Chaberton (2.674 m) connects the Chaberton with the Pointe Rochers Charniers and the main ridge. Chaberton is in the municipality of Montgenèvre in the Briançonnais region. It is easily recognisable by its pyramidal shape and flat top.

History 

Until 1947 Mont Chaberton was in Italy, located in the municipality of Cesana Torinese.

In 1883 Italy joined the Triple Alliance and started strengthening its defences against France. Between 1898 and 1910 Italian troops built an artillery battery on the summit that pointed towards France, in particular at the town of Briançon, and the pass to Italy over the Col de Montgenèvre. A road was built to the summit from the village of Fénils in the Susa Valley by soldiers and engineers led by Major Engineer Luigi Pollari Maglietta. They flattened the summit by about 6 metres to provide a surface for the eight towers. Their height of 12 metres was designed to overcome the highest snowfall recorded.

Each emplacement was manned by seven men, who were protected by a relatively lightly armoured dome because the battery was thought to be out of reach of conventional artillery. Eight 149mm guns were mounted in the individual masonry towers. The fort was dubbed the "Fort of the Clouds" because it was often hidden in the clouds.

During the First World War, when Italy entered the war alongside the Triple Entente, the guns were removed to be used on the front against the Austro-Hungarian Empire.

Under the Benito Mussolini's regime, Chaberton was rearmed again to threaten Briançon. In 1940, the garrison had about 340 men under the command of Captain Spartaco Bevilacqua.

The French army installed four 280mm mortars dating back to the battle of Verdun in the First World War, divided into two batteries and camouflaged: one on Eyrette, the other at Poët Morand below Fort de l'. Both sites were outside the view of the Italians. These two sections manned by the 6th Battery of the 154th Régiment d'Artillerie de Position (154th RAP). Because of the altitude of the mortars and their target, special artillery tables had to be calculated.

When Italy entered the Second World War, they bombarded the French positions around Briançon on 20 June, but Italian troops did not advance. Little damage was inflicted. Because of cloud on the peak, the French could not respond. On 21 June 1940 the 154th Artillery Regiment destroyed six of the eight turrets using their mortars. They were guided by observers on the nearby Mont Janus. Nine Italians were killed and 50 were wounded. Turrets 7 and 8 continued to fire over the next three days, until the cease-fire of 24 June 1940.

The fort was abandoned 8 September 1943. It was briefly re-occupied in autumn 1944 by paratroopers of the Italian Social Republic.

At the end of the war France acquired the mountain, and the border was moved to the edge of the Italian village of Claviere. In 1957 all the remains of the guns and armour were removed. The masonry that supported the turrets is still visible. The remaining underground structures are in a dangerous condition.

Geology 
The portion closest to the peak is composed of white and yellowish dolomite dating back to the upper Late Triassic ; moving away from the summit there are formations of limestone and compact dolomite and grey limestone shale, limestone of the Jurassic in a structure syncline. On the ridge between the summit and the nearby are outcrops of mica schist with quartz, crystalline limestones and porphyritic rocks.

References

Bibliography 
 Une victoire dans la défaite - La destruction du Chaberton, Briançon 1940, Max Schiavon éditions Anovi, 2007

External links
 Cycling Mont Chaberton
 The geology of Mont Chaberton
 The fort of Chaberton
 Guide to the mountain

Alpine three-thousanders
Mountains of the Alps
Mountains of Hautes-Alpes